Protoproutia is a genus of moths in the family Geometridae erected by James Halliday McDunnough in 1939.

Species
Protoproutia rusticaria McDunnough, 1939
Protoproutia laredoata (Cassino, 1931)

References

Sterrhini